Beverly is a city in Burlington County in the U.S. state of New Jersey. As of the 2020 United States census, the city's population was 2,499, a decrease of 78 (−3.0%) from the 2010 census count of 2,577, which in turn reflected a decline of 84 (−3.2%) from the 2,661 counted in the 2000 census.

Beverly was originally incorporated as a borough on March 5, 1850, within Willingboro Township. Beverly was incorporated as a city by an act of the New Jersey Legislature on April 13, 1857, replacing Beverly borough, based on the results of a referendum held that day. Beverly Township, formed in 1859, co-existed alongside Beverly City and was renamed as Delanco Township in 1926. The borough was named for Beverley, England.

The city had the 15th-highest property tax rate in New Jersey, with an equalized rate of 4.550% in 2020, compared to 2.676% in the county as a whole and a statewide average of 2.279%.

Geography
According to the United States Census Bureau, the city had a total area of 0.76 square miles (1.96 km2), including 0.54 square miles (1.40 km2) of land and 0.21 square miles (0.56 km2) of water (28.16%).

Beverly borders Delanco Township and Edgewater Park in Burlington County; and Bensalem Township across the Delaware River in Bucks County, Pennsylvania.

Demographics

2010 census

The Census Bureau's 2006–2010 American Community Survey showed that (in 2010 inflation-adjusted dollars) median household income was $51,964 (with a margin of error of +/− $3,191) and the median family income was $61,058 (+/− $8,725). Males had a median income of $47,738 (+/− $9,129) and females $40,833 (+/− $13,858). The per capita income was $30,364 (+/− $4,953). About 14.1% of families and 15.2% of the population were below the poverty line, including 31.6% of those under age 18 and 12.5% of those age 65 or over.

2000 census
At the 2000 United States census, there were 2,661 people, 960 households and 694 families residing in the city. The racial makeup of the city was 64.67% White, 28.75% African American, 0.11% Native American, 0.90% Asian, 1.43% from other races, and 4.13% from two or more races. Hispanic or Latino of any race were 4.58% of the population.

There were 960 households, of which 33.3% had children under the age of 18 living with them, 44.6% were married couples living together, 22.7% had a female householder with no husband present, and 27.7% were non-families. 21.6% of all households were made up of individuals, and 10.1% had someone living alone who was 65 years of age or older. The average household size was 2.77 and the average family size was 3.23.

28.3% of the population were under the age of 18, 8.8% from 18 to 24, 29.8% from 25 to 44, 21.2% from 45 to 64, and 11.8% who were 65 years of age or older. The median age was 35 years. For every 100 females, there were 88.7 males. For every 100 females age 18 and over, there were 85.3 males.

The median household income was $45,054 and the median family income was $49,519. Males had a median income of $35,954 and females $23,836. The per capita income was $17,760. About 8.5% of families and 11.5% of the population were below the poverty line, including 16.9% of those under age 18 and 6.9% of those age 65 or over.

Government

Local government
Beverly is governed under the City form of New Jersey municipal government. The city is one of 15 municipalities (of the 564) statewide that use this traditional form of government. The governing body is comprised of an elected mayor and a five-member elected city council who are chosen at-large on a partisan basis to serve four-year terms of office as part of the November general election, with either two or three seats coming up for election in odd-numbered years. Responsibilities of the governing body include all executive and legislative functions.

, the Mayor of the City of Beverly is Democrat Randy H. Miller Sr., whose term of office ends December 31, 2023. Members of the Beverly Common Council are Council President Robert H. Bancroft (D, 2025), Council President Pro-Tem Robert E. Lowden Jr. (D, 2025), Riccardo D. Dale (D, 2025), Mark Schwedes (Republican Party, 2023) and Councilwomen Bernardine Williams (D, 2023).

Luis Crespo was appointed by the council in December 2012 to fill the vacant seat of Scott Perkins. In the November 2013 general election, Republican Mark Schwedes defeated Crespo to win the remaining two years of the unexpired term.

Federal, state and county representation
Beverly is located in the 3rd Congressional District and is part of New Jersey's 7th state legislative district.

 

Burlington County is governed by a Board of County Commissioners comprised of five members who are chosen at-large in partisan elections to serve three-year terms of office on a staggered basis, with either one or two seats coming up for election each year; at an annual reorganization meeting, the board selects a director and deputy director from among its members to serve a one-year term. , Burlington County's Commissioners are
Director Felicia Hopson (D, Willingboro Township, term as commissioner ends December 31, 2024; term as director ends 2023),
Deputy Director Tom Pullion (D, Edgewater Park, term as commissioner and as deputy director ends 2023),
Allison Eckel (D, Medford, 2025),
Daniel J. O'Connell (D, Delran Township, 2024) and 
Balvir Singh (D, Burlington Township, 2023). 
Burlington County's Constitutional Officers are
County Clerk Joanne Schwartz (R, Southampton Township, 2023)
Sheriff James H. Kostoplis (D, Bordentown, 2025) and 
Surrogate Brian J. Carlin (D, Burlington Township, 2026).

Politics
On March 2011, there were 1,543 registered voters in Beverly City, of whom 608 (39.4% vs. 33.3% countywide) were registered as Democrats, 262 (17.0% vs. 23.9%) were registered as Republicans and 673 (43.6% vs. 42.8%) were registered as Unaffiliated. There were no voters registered to other parties. Among the city's 2010 Census population, 59.9% (vs. 61.7% in Burlington County) were registered to vote, including 77.9% of those ages 18 and over (vs. 80.3% countywide).

In the 2012 presidential election, Democrat Barack Obama received 797 votes here (68.6% vs. 58.1% countywide), ahead of Republican Mitt Romney with 330 votes (28.4% vs. 40.2%) and other candidates with 14 votes (1.2% vs. 1.0%), among the 1,161 ballots cast by the city's 1,642 registered voters, for a turnout of 70.7% (vs. 74.5% in Burlington County). In the 2008 presidential election, Democrat Barack Obama received 850 votes here (68.6% vs. 58.4% countywide), ahead of Republican John McCain with 365 votes (29.5% vs. 39.9%) and other candidates with 13 votes (1.0% vs. 1.0%), among the 1,239 ballots cast by the city's 1,559 registered voters, for a turnout of 79.5% (vs. 80.0% in Burlington County). In the 2004 presidential election, Democrat John Kerry received 655 votes here (60.0% vs. 52.9% countywide), ahead of Republican George W. Bush with 398 votes (36.4% vs. 46.0%) and other candidates with 24 votes (2.2% vs. 0.8%), among the 1,092 ballots cast by the city's 1,442 registered voters, for a turnout of 75.7% (vs. 78.8% in the whole county).

In the 2013 gubernatorial election, Republican Chris Christie received 395 votes here (54.6% vs. 61.4% countywide), ahead of Democrat Barbara Buono with 300 votes (41.5% vs. 35.8%) and other candidates with 12 votes (1.7% vs. 1.2%), among the 723 ballots cast by the city's 1,625 registered voters, yielding a 44.5% turnout (vs. 44.5% in the county). In the 2009 gubernatorial election, Democrat Jon Corzine received 422 ballots cast (52.7% vs. 44.5% countywide), ahead of Republican Chris Christie with 306 votes (38.2% vs. 47.7%), Independent Chris Daggett with 47 votes (5.9% vs. 4.8%) and other candidates with 12 votes (1.5% vs. 1.2%), among the 801 ballots cast by the city's 1,590 registered voters, yielding a 50.4% turnout (vs. 44.9% in the county).

Education
The Beverly City Schools serve students in public school for pre-kindergarten through eighth grade at Beverly City School. As of the 2018–19 school year, the district, comprised of one school, had an enrollment of 314 students and 28.5 classroom teachers (on an FTE basis), for a student–teacher ratio of 11.0:1.

For ninth through twelfth grades, students in public school from Beverly and Riverton attend Palmyra High School in Palmyra, as part of sending/receiving relationships with the Palmyra Public Schools. As of the 2018–19 school year, the high school had an enrollment of 468 students and 39.3 classroom teachers (on an FTE basis), for a student–teacher ratio of 11.9:1. Beverly's sending relationship has been in place since 1967 after the City of Burlington Public School District decided that it could no longer accommodate students from Beverly at Burlington City High School.

Students from Beverly, and from all of Burlington County, are eligible to attend the Burlington County Institute of Technology, a countywide public school district that serves the vocational and technical education needs of students at the high school and post-secondary level at its campuses in Medford and Westampton.

Transportation

Roads and highways

County Route 543 is the most prominent roadway in Beverly.

Public transportation
The Beverly/Edgewater Park station provides service between the Trenton Transit Center in Trenton and the Walter Rand Transportation Center (and other stops) in Camden on NJ Transit's River Line light rail system.

NJ Transit provides bus service on route 419 between Burlington and Camden.

BurLink bus service is offered on the B1 route (between Beverly and Pemberton) and on the B2 route (between Beverly and Westampton).

Points of interest

 Beverly National Cemetery was created in 1863 with the purchase of a single acre of land and was expanded five times from 1936 to 1951, before being added to the National Register of Historic Places in 1997.
 St. Stephen's Episcopal Church, consecrated by the Episcopal Diocese of New Jersey in 1837, was added to the National Register of Historic Places in 1999. The church, which celebrated its 175th anniversary in 2012, had its tower and steeple renovated at a cost of $450,000 raised from parish members and local organizations.

Notable people

People who were born in, residents of, or otherwise closely associated with Beverly include:

 Grace Alekhine (1876–1956), artist and chess master
 Sam Calderone (1926–2006), Major League Baseball catcher who played for three seasons
 John Lowden Knight (1915–2001), professor, university administrator, and a Methodist theologian
 A. Merritt (1884–1943), author best known for his fantasy works
 Barney Schultz (1926–2015), former pitcher in the Major Leagues from 1955–1965, who played for the St. Louis Cardinals, Detroit Tigers, and Chicago Cubs
 James F. Scott (1942–2020), physicist and research director at the Cavendish Laboratory

References

External links

 
1850 establishments in New Jersey
Cities in Burlington County, New Jersey
City form of New Jersey government
Populated places established in 1850
New Jersey populated places on the Delaware River